The 1965 European Cup Winners' Cup Final was a football match between West Ham United of England and 1860 Munich of West Germany. The final was held at Wembley Stadium in London on 19 May 1965. It was the final match of the 1964–65 European Cup Winners' Cup and the fifth European Cup Winners' Cup final since the competition's inception.

Route to the final

Match

Summary
West Ham began the game brightly, but despite chances at both ends, there was no score at half-time. The breakthrough came in the 70th minute when Ronnie Boyce threaded a pass between two defenders and Alan Sealey scored from a difficult angle. Two minutes later, a free kick to West Ham was not cleared; Bobby Moore crossed the ball, Radenkovic failed to collect the ball and Sealey scored a second goal to seal the match for West Ham.

Details

See also 
West Ham United F.C. in European football

References

External links
UEFA Cup Winners' Cup results at Rec.Sport.Soccer Statistics Foundation
1965 European Cup Winners' Cup Final at UEFA.com

3
1965
West Ham United F.C. matches
TSV 1860 Munich matches
International club association football competitions hosted by London
1964–65 in German football
1964–65 in English football
May 1965 sports events in the United Kingdom
1965 sports events in London
Events at Wembley Stadium